Dmytro Pidruchnyi (born 5 November 1991) is a Ukrainian biathlete. He participated at 2014 and 2018 Winter Olympics. In March 2022, Pidruchnyi joined the Ukrainian National Guard to fight during the 2022 Russian invasion of Ukraine.

Career
Pidruchnyi was born in village Ostriv near Ternopil. Dmytro's first international competition was 2010 Junior World Championships in Swedish Torsby. He didn't have much success then. He also wasn't very successful next season. But at 2012 Junior Worlds in Kontiolahti he finally showed good results which allowed him to start in IBU Cup and debut in World Cup. On 13 December 2012, he was with 6 misses just 98th in Pokljuka, Slovenia. Nevertheless he competed some more sprints that season.

His performances improved in 2013–14 season. In Hochfilzen Dmytro had surprising 6th place in sprint. Since then Pidruchnyi is on a regular basis in national team. He participated at 2014 Winter Olympics in Sochi, Russia. He was just 55th in individual race and 9th in men's relay.

On 6 February 2015, Pidruchnyi had his first team podium in mixed relay in Nové Město. That year he debuted at World Championships. Up to date his best World Cup finish is 4th in mass start in Ruhpolding where he lost bronze to Norway's Tarjei Bø.

He qualified to represent Ukraine at the 2018 Winter Olympics. In Pyeongchang he was 21st in sprint, 34th in pursuit, 7th in mixed relay and 9th in relay.

He won pursuit at World Championships 2019 in Östersund, Sweden.

Biathlon results
All results are sourced from the International Biathlon Union.

Olympic Games
0 medals

*The mixed relay was added as an event in 2014.

World Championships
1 medal (1 gold)

*During Olympic seasons competitions are only held for those events not included in the Olympic program.
**The single mixed relay was added as an event in 2019.

World Cup

Relay podiums

Rankings

Notes

References

External links

Biathlon.com.ua
IBU.com
IBU Datacenter

1991 births
Living people
P
Olympic biathletes of Ukraine
Biathletes at the 2014 Winter Olympics
Biathletes at the 2018 Winter Olympics
Biathletes at the 2022 Winter Olympics
Universiade medalists in biathlon
Biathlon World Championships medalists
Universiade gold medalists for Ukraine
Universiade silver medalists for Ukraine
Universiade bronze medalists for Ukraine
Competitors at the 2013 Winter Universiade
Sportspeople from Ternopil Oblast
21st-century Ukrainian people
Ukrainian military personnel of the 2022 Russian invasion of Ukraine
Territorial Defense Forces of Ukraine personnel